The Roman Catholic Diocese of Kano is a diocese located in the city of Kano in the Ecclesiastical province of Kaduna in Nigeria.

History
 March 22, 1991: Established as Mission “sui iuris” of Kano from the Metropolitan Archdiocese of Kaduna
 December 15, 1995: Promoted as Apostolic Vicariate of Kano
 April 22, 1999: Promoted as Diocese of Kano

Special churches
The Cathedral is Cathedral of Our Lady of Fatima in Kano.

Leadership
 Ecclesiastical Superior of Kano (Roman rite) 
 Fr. John Francis Brown, S.M.A. (1991 – 1995)
 Vicar Apostolic of Kano (Roman rite) 
 Bishop Patrick Francis Sheehan, O.S.A. (1996.07.05 – 1999.06.22 see below)
 Bishops of Kano (Roman rite)
 Bishop Patrick Francis Sheehan, O.S.A. (see above 1999-2008)
 Bishop John Namawzah Niyiring, O.S.A., since 20 March 2008

See also
Roman Catholicism in Nigeria

External links
 GCatholic.org Information
 Catholic Hierarchy
 Our Lady of Fatima Cathedral Parish in Kano, Nigeria 

Kano
Christian organizations established in 1960
Roman Catholic dioceses and prelatures established in the 20th century
1960 establishments in Nigeria
Roman Catholic Ecclesiastical Province of Kaduna